Te Kāhui Whaihanga New Zealand Institute of Architects (NZIA) is a membership-based professional organisation that represents 90 per cent of all registered architects in New Zealand, and promotes architecture that enhances the New Zealand living environment.

The organisation was founded in 1905, and provides services to New Zealand architects, such as ongoing professional training, policies and guidelines to promote high quality architectural practice, events and general support for the architectural profession in New Zealand.

New Zealand Architecture Awards 

The Institute also functions to celebrate outstanding architecture, in part by presenting annual awards for excellence in architecture. These annual awards are named the New Zealand Architecture Awards, and have been sponsored by Resene paints since 1990. The awards programme consists of Local Awards, run by each of the Institute's eight branches, and New Zealand Awards, a national level distinction.

From 2016, the NZIA's "named awards" replaced the New Zealand Architecture Medal as the country's highest level of architectural achievement. Named awards are conferred in categories of public, commercial, educational and residential architecture, and are named for influential New Zealand architects Sir Ian Athfield, Sir Miles Warren, John Scott and Ted McCoy, each of whom has made a powerful contribution to the practice of architecture in New Zealand.

The most prestigious award in New Zealand architecture is the NZIA Gold Medal, which is awarded to an individual architect who has made an outstanding contribution to the field.

The Institute is not responsible for the registration of architects, which is within the purview of the New Zealand Registered Architects Board (NZRAB).

Gold Medal 
The (NZIA) Gold Medal is the highest award of the New Zealand Institute of Architects. The Gold Medal is awarded to an individual for an outstanding contribution to the practice of architecture, demonstrated through the production of a consistently high-quality body of work over a period of time.

Winners
 2021 Julie Stout
 2020 Dave Strachan
 2018 Jeremy Salmond
2017 Andrew Patterson
2016 Roger Walker
 2015 Stuart Gardyne
 2014 Patrick Clifford
 2013 Pip Cheshire
 2012 Pete Bossley
 2011 Jack Manning
 2010 Marshall Cook
 2008 Ivan Mercep
 2006 Gordon Moller
 2005 David Mitchell
 2004 Ian Athfield
 2003 Peter Beaven
 2002 Ted McCoy
2001 Group Architects
2000 Sir Miles Warren
1999 John Scott (posthumously)

See also
Architecture of New Zealand

References

External links
New Zealand Institute of Architects
NZIA Gold Medal

1906 establishments in New Zealand
Architecture-related professional associations
Architecture in New Zealand
Commonwealth Association of Architects
Professional associations based in New Zealand